Estadio Bicentenario Francisco Sánchez Rumoroso is a multi-purpose stadium in Coquimbo, Chile. Currently, it is mostly used for football matches. It is the home stadium of Coquimbo Unido. The former stadium was inaugurated on July 1, 1970 and hold 17,750 people.

In 2007 the stadium was selected as a venue for the 2008 FIFA U-20 Women's World Cup. In order to comply with FIFA standards, a completely new stadium was built. Its capacity was increased from 15,000 to 18,750. The new stadium has the shape of ship so as to homage Coquimbo's oceanic tradition. The city has been famous due to its port and pirate lore. The stadium was inaugurated on November 9, 2008.

Gallery

References

External links
FIFA site

Francisco Sanchez Rumoroso
Sports venues in Coquimbo Region
Multi-purpose stadiums in Chile